Egg oil (CAS No. 8001–17–0, INCI: egg oil), also known as egg yolk oil or ovum oil, is derived from the yolk of chicken eggs consisting mainly of triglycerides with traces of lecithin, cholesterol, biotin, xanthophylls lutein and zeaxanthin, and immunoglobulins.  It is free of egg proteins and hence may be used safely by people who are allergic to eggs, for topical applications such as hair and skin care. The product has several historical references in Unani (Greek) medicine for hair care. Traditional Chinese medicine uses egg oil for burns, eczema, dermatitis, mouth ulcers, skin ulcers, chapped nipples, tinea capitis, ringworm, nasal vestibulitis, frostbite, and hemorrhoids.

Production 

In alchemy, the oil was traditionally extracted from the yolk by a fairly simple process, by which fifty eggs yielded approximately five ounces of oil. Modern methods of production include liquid–liquid extraction using common solvents such as hexane, petroleum ether, chloroform, and ethanol. Unlike traditional egg oil produced by heat, solvent extracted product also contains immunoglobulins, which are destroyed at higher temperatures. There are only a few commercial producers globally.

Composition 
The fatty acid composition of egg oil is rich in long-chain polyunsaturated fatty acids (LCPUFA) such as omega-3 fatty acids (including docosahexaenoic acid) and omega-6 fatty acids (including arachidonic acid), and closely resembles the fatty acid profile of human milk, as well as the lipid profile of human skin.

Complete fatty acid profile 
{|class="wikitable1"
|- 
| Oleic acid (18:1)       
| 37.6%
|- 
| Palmitic acid (16:0)     
| 35.7%
|- 
| Linoleic acid (18:2)     
| 10.7%
|- 
| Palmitoleic acid (16:1)  
|  7.7%
|- 
| Stearic acid (18:0)      
|  3.3%
|- 
| Myristic acid (14:0)     
|  1.1%
|- 
| Docosahexaenoic acid (22:6)
| 0.5%
|- 
| Myristoleic acid (14:1)  
|  0.4%
|- 
| Heptadecanoic acid (17:0)
|  0.3%
|- 
| Arachidonic acid (20:4)  
|  0.2%
|- 
| Arachidic acid (20:0)   
|  0.2%
|- 
| Linolenic acid (18:3)    
|  0.1%
|- 
| Pentadecanoic acid (15:0)
|  0.1%
|}

Typical analysis 
{|class="wikitable1"
|- 
| Appearance        
| Yellow coloured, hazy liquid
|- 
| Consistency     
| Viscous liquid/thickened/Semi-solid at 25 C.
|- 
| Odour     
| Mild characteristic odour of egg
|- 
| Refractive Index  
|  1.46 – 1.48
|- 
| Cholesterol     
|  3% – 4.0%
|- 
| Specific Gravity      
|  0.93 – 0.98@25 deg. C 
|-
| Gardner color scale     
|  11 Max.
|- 
| Acid value
| < 35.0 (mg KOH/g)
|- 
| Iodine Value  
|  > 60
|}

Uses

Cosmetics 
Egg yolk has been used in traditional cosmetics since the eleventh century in Jewish, Greek, Arab, and Latin cultures. Several popular modern cosmetic brands contain egg oil.

Hair care 
Egg oil is widely used in Indian medicine for hair care to treat hair fall, dandruff, grey hair and frizzy hair.

Skin care 
Egg oil can be used as an excipient/carrier in a variety of cosmetic preparations such as creams, ointments, sun-screen products, treatment of sunburn or lotions where it acts as an emollient, moisturizer, anti-oxidant, penetration enhancer, occlusive skin conditioner, and anti-bacterial agent.

Pharmaceuticals

Scabies 
For treatment of scabies in Spain, oil of egg yolk was used along with oil of castor and roses in ancient Andalusia.

Wounds 
Egg oil was traditionally used in treating wounds and injuries. In the 16th century, Ambroise Paré used a solution of egg yolk, oil of roses, and turpentine for war wounds, an old method that the Romans had discovered 1000 years before him. He published his first book The method of curing wounds caused by arquebus and firearms in 1545.

Infant nutrition 
Egg oil is a potential source of polyunsaturated fatty acids such as docosahexaenoic acid and arachidonic acid for infant nutrition or combined with fish oil for infant formula production. It is also a source of vitamin D.

References 

Eggs in culture
Traditional medicine
Cosmetics
Skin care